Piro's Spire, (also Piros Spire), is a  basalt pinnacle summit in the Olympic Mountains and is located in Jefferson County of Washington state. It is situated in Olympic National Park and the nearest higher neighbor is Diamond Mountain, 1.86 miles (3.0 km) to the west. Both are minor summits of the Mount Anderson massif, with Piro's Spire being the easternmost outlier.

History

The first ascent of the mountain was made in 1947 by Don Dooley, Elvin Johnson, and Norma Johnson. The peak was named by Elvin Johnson in honor of his friend and climbing companion, Robert F. Piro, a former fire guard at the nearby Dose Meadows station (1941). Piro, of the 85th Regiment of the Tenth Mountain Infantry Division, was killed on Riva Ridge in Italy during World War II.

Climate

Based on the Köppen climate classification, Piro's Spire is located in the marine west coast climate zone of western North America. Most weather fronts originate in the Pacific Ocean, and travel northeast toward the Olympic Mountains. As fronts approach, they are forced upward by the peaks of the Olympic Range, causing them to drop their moisture in the form of rain or snowfall (Orographic lift). As a result, the Olympics experience high precipitation, especially during the winter months. During winter months, weather is usually cloudy, but, due to high pressure systems over the Pacific Ocean that intensify during summer months, there is often little or no cloud cover during the summer. In terms of favorable weather, June to September are the best months for climbing the mountain. Precipitation runoff from the mountain drains into tributaries of the Dosewallips River.

See also
 Olympic Mountains
 Geology of the Pacific Northwest

References

External links
 Piro's Spire weather: Mountain Forecast
 

Olympic Mountains
Mountains of Jefferson County, Washington
Mountains of Washington (state)
Landforms of Olympic National Park
North American 1000 m summits